Tijani Babangida (born 25 September 1973) is a Nigerian former professional footballer, who played as a winger. Known for his pace, his playing style was sometimes compared to that of Marc Overmars. Babangida spent the majority of his playing career at Ajax. Overall, he played in five countries on three continents. At club level, Babangida spent nine years in Netherlands, playing for VVV-Venlo, Roda JC Ajax, and Vitesse. winning the Eredivisie plus KNVB Cup double with the latter side.

He played over 30 games for his national side, including four at the 1998 World Cup in France. He participated in two Africa Cup of Nations tournaments and won the 1996 Olympics with Nigeria. Babangida made his international debut in 1994. He lost his place in the squad right before the 2002 World Cup. After a two-year lay-off from international football, Babangida was recalled to the Nigeria team for the 2004 African Cup of Nations preparations in Tunisia.

Club career

Early career
Babangida was born in Kaduna, Nigeria. In 1991, at the age of 17, he left local club Niger Tornadoes to sign with Dutch Eredivisie side Roda JC, after performing well at the 1991 All-Africa Games. He was loaned out to Roda's league rivals VVV-Venlo until the end of the season. Babangida made a total of six league appearances, scoring three times in the 1991–92 season. Despite Venlo's relegation to Eerste Divisie, Babangida remained at the club for another year.

Babangida received his breakthrough in the 1992–93 season as he scored 16 goals, helping Venlo to achieve promotion to Eredivisie. The following season, Babangida returned to Roda, immediately becoming a first-team regular with the Kerkrade side. Babangida made a total of 29 league appearances for Roda that season, scoring 11 goals.

Babangida spent two more seasons at Roda JC. Babangida's 10 league goals in 1995–96, made him the club's top scorer that season. In 1995, Babangida made his European debut, scoring a goal in the UEFA Cup first-round win over Olimpija Ljubljana, Roda's first European campaign in five years. Roda went on to beat the Slovenian side 5–2 on aggregate, but lost to Benfica in the second round. Solid performances at both international and club level led to interest from Dutch side Ajax, as Louis van Gaal was looking to replace Babangida's compatriot Finidi George, who had recently departed to Real Betis.

Ajax
Babangida joined Ajax in the summer of 1996 in a long-anticipated €5 million move. He appeared in 29 league games, scoring four goals in his first season with Ajax. Babangida played an important role in Ajax's European campaign, scoring three goals, including one against Auxerre in the group stages, and the winning goal in the second leg of the UEFA Champions League encounter with Atlético Madrid at the Vicente Calderón Stadium, that put Ajax through to the semi-finals of the competition.

Babangida had a successful second season with the club as he helped Ajax to another Eredivisie title with a 39-point gap over PSV Eindhoven, while his 13 league goals in 26 games made him the club's third top scorer, behind Shota Arveladze and Jari Litmanen. Ajax clinched the second title of the season with a 5–0 victory over PSV in the KNVB Cup final, with the Nigerian scoring the first goal.

Babangida's fortunes started to change towards the end of 1998. Having missed the start of the season with malaria, Babangida gradually lost his starting line-up position as Morten Olsen was looking to improve on the team's inconsistent performances both in the domestic league and in Europe. Babangida started two of his team's opening Champions League games. The European season, however, ended in disappointment as Ajax finished bottom of their group behind Olympiacos, Dinamo Zagreb and Porto. Overall, Babangida appeared in 18 league games for Ajax that season, starting only seven. He didn't feature in the Dutch Cup final where Ajax managed to retain the trophy after beating Fortuna Sittard in the final.

Babangida saw even less playing time after the 1999 season, as he made a mere eight appearances the following year and didn't play a single game in the first half of the 2000–01 season. In an attempt to offload the player, Ajax came to an agreement with the Turkish Süper Lig side Gençlerbirliği, who signed Babangida on a half-year loan deal until the end of the season.

Later career
The spell in Turkey, however, proved to be an unhappy time for Babangida and the Ankara side chose no to pursue their interest in the player once the loan deal expired. Looking for a move away from Netherlands, Babangida came close to signing with AJ Auxerre, but received a last-minute call from Ronald Koeman and agreed to join him at Vitesse instead. Another loan move followed. First team player under Koeman, Babangida subsequently lost his place in the starting line-up, when Ronald Koeman left for Ajax and was replaced by Edward Sturing.

He then signed a six-month loan deal with Al-Ittihad of Saudi Arabia in 2002, joining Bebeto and Titi Camara, but walked out of the team in November after disagreements with José Oscar Bernardi. Looking to resolve the deadlock with Ajax, Babangida returned to Amsterdam to continue negotiating a termination of his contract with the club. On 30 April 2003, three years since Babangida played his last game for the club, it was announced that both sides had come to an agreement and the player's contract was finally terminated.

As a free agent, Babangida underwent a successful trial at Chinese side Tianjin Teda in the summer of 2003. The move, however, was put off due to the outbreak of SARS in China, and Babangida signed with the second-tier side Changchun Yatai shortly after. His four goals in the second part of the season helped his team to the Jia B title and earned him a recall to the national team for their preparations for the 2004 African Cup of Nations. Babangida scored four more goals for Yatai the following season before retiring in 2004.

International career
Babangida received his first call-up to the senior Nigeria national team for a pre-World Cup friendly against Romania in 1994. He then played in a friendly against Georgia, but did not make the final squad for 1994 World Cup.

Babangida's international chances were partly limited due to the fact that he often found himself behind Finidi George in the pecking order. He played an important role in his team's Olympic triumph in Atlanta in 1996, as Nigeria overcame tough resistance from Brazil and Argentina, packed with the likes of Dida, Roberto Carlos, Bebeto, Ronaldo, Rivaldo, Hernán Crespo, Claudio López, Ariel Ortega and Diego Simeone among others. Babangida took part in Nigeria's 1998 World Cup campaign, playing a total of 120 minutes as he started one game and came on as a sub in the other three. He scored his team's only goal in the second-round defeat to Denmark. In January 2001, Babangida appeared in an exhibition game at the Yokohama International Stadium (known as the Nissan Stadium nowadays), playing for FIFA XI in a game against the unified team of Japan and South Korea.

Babangida only made his African Nations Cup debut in 2000 as Nigeria withdrew from the 1996 edition in South Africa due to political reasons and missed out on 1998 African Cup of Nations through disqualification. Babangida scored two spectacular goals against South Africa to put Nigeria through to the final against Cameroon, where they drew 2–2, before being narrowly defeated 3–4 on penalties. He appeared in all of his team's five games, starting two.

He then featured in Nigeria's run to the 2002 World Cup finals, scoring two important first-half goals against Ghana on the final day of the 2002 World Cup qualification, helping Nigeria seal the final African region World Cup berth. Babangida played in all of his team's games at the 2002 Nations Cup, but was dropped ahead of the World Cup, alongside several other experienced players like Sunday Oliseh and Finidi George. He was recalled to the national team for the pre-Nations Cup training camp in Faro, Portugal in 2004, but did not make the final squad, making the 2002 Cup of Nations his last major international tournament.

Personal life
Babangida, sometimes nicknamed "TJ", was born into a large family in the city of Kaduna in 1973. He was married to Rabah (now his ex), the sister of Daniel Amokachi's wife. Two of his nine brothers, Ibrahim and Haruna are also footballers. The former spent five years at Volendam, while the latter became the youngest ever player in the history of Spanish football to have a buy-out clause in his contract and the second youngest player to appear for FC Barcelona, when he made his debut in 1998 as a fifteen-year-old.
In 1997 Babangida acted in a commercial ad for ABN-AMRO in which he points out his hesitations about a contract of some sort. In 2004, Babangida signed a $2 million contract to bring new footballs to Nigeria. The same year, he opened a shopping mall in Kaduna. Upon retiring from professional football, Babangida has been working as a football agent.

Career statistics

Club

International

Scores and results list Nigeria's goal tally first, score column indicates score after each Babangida goal.

Honours
Summer Olympics: 1996
Eredivisie: 1997–98
KNVB Cup: 1997–98, 1998–99
Turkish Cup: 2000–01
Jia B: 2003

References

External links

1973 births
Living people
Sportspeople from Kaduna
Association football wingers
Nigerian footballers
Roda JC Kerkrade players
VVV-Venlo players
AFC Ajax players
Gençlerbirliği S.K. footballers
SBV Vitesse players
Ittihad FC players
Changchun Yatai F.C. players
Eredivisie players
Eerste Divisie players
Süper Lig players
Saudi Professional League players
Nigeria international footballers
Footballers at the 1996 Summer Olympics
Olympic footballers of Nigeria
Olympic gold medalists for Nigeria
1998 FIFA World Cup players
2000 African Cup of Nations players
2002 African Cup of Nations players
Nigerian expatriate footballers
Expatriate footballers in the Netherlands
Nigerian expatriate sportspeople in the Netherlands
Expatriate footballers in Turkey
Nigerian expatriate sportspeople in Turkey
Expatriate footballers in Saudi Arabia
Nigerian expatriate sportspeople in Saudi Arabia
Expatriate footballers in China
Nigerian expatriate sportspeople in China
Niger Tornadoes F.C. players
Olympic medalists in football
Medalists at the 1996 Summer Olympics
Babangida brothers